Ilia may refer to:

Science and medicine
Apatura ilia or lesser purple emperor, a butterfly
Ilium (bone) (plural: "ilia"), pelvic bone

People
 Ilia (name), numerous
Ilia II, the current Catholicos-Patriarch of All Georgia

Places
Ilia, Hunedoara, Romania
Elis (regional unit), Greece
Elis Province, Greece

Arts and literature
Ilia, a character in Idomeneo, an opera by Mozart
Ilia (The Legend of Zelda), a character in the video game The Legend of Zelda: Twilight Princess
Ilia (Star Trek), a character in Star Trek: The Motion Picture
Ilia, a nation of the continent Elibe from the Fire Emblem series
Ilia the Righteous, a prominent figure of new Georgian literature
Rhea Silvia or Ilia, the mother of Romulus and Remus in Roman mythology

Other
Illinois Institute of Art – Chicago, a nonprofit institution
Ilia (band), a rock band
Arturo Umberto Illia (1900–1983), former president of Argentina

See also
Elia (disambiguation)
Ilija (disambiguation)
Ilja
Ilya (disambiguation)